Diego Angel Luna (born September 7, 2003) is an American professional soccer player who plays as an attacking midfielder for Major League Soccer club Real Salt Lake.

Club career
Born in Sunnyvale, California, Luna began his career with the Palo Alto Soccer Club before joining the youth setup at Major League Soccer club San Jose Earthquakes in 2015. With the Earthquakes, Luna participated in various tournaments, including the Dallas Cup and Generation Adidas Cup. In 2018, Luna left the Earthquakes academy and joined the Barcelona Residency Academy, the Arizona based academy for Spanish club Barcelona.

El Paso Locomotive
On April 5, 2021, Luna signed a professional contract with USL Championship club El Paso Locomotive. He made his debut for the club on May 8 in their season opening 1–1 draw against New Mexico United. He came on as a 78th minute substitute for Richie Ryan. Following the match, as well as the second against Rio Grande Valley Toros, Locomotive head coach Mark Lowry said, "He has the mentality to go to the very top and we’re gonna help him do that."

Luna scored his first professional goal for El Paso on June 3, the winning goal in a 1–0 road victory over Austin Bold. He headed in a crossed ball from Macauley King in the 56th minute to give his side all three points.

Real Salt Lake
On June 2, 2022, Luna transferred to Real Salt Lake in a USL record deal of $250,000. He made his debut as an 88th minute substitute against Vancouver Whitecaps.

International career
Luna has received call-ups to camps with the United States under-14, under-17, and under-20 youth national teams.

In 2022, Luna featured prominently with the United States U-20 team that won the CONCACAF U-20 championship, securing berths for the 2023 FIFA U-20 World Cup and the 2024 Olympics in the process.

Personal life
Born in the United States, Luna is of Mexican descent.

Career statistics

Club

Honors
United States U20
CONCACAF U-20 Championship: 2022

References

External links
 Profile at El Paso Locomotive

2003 births
Living people
People from Redwood City, California
American soccer players
American sportspeople of Mexican descent
Association football midfielders
El Paso Locomotive FC players
Real Salt Lake players
Major League Soccer players
USL Championship players
Soccer players from California
Sportspeople from the San Francisco Bay Area
United States men's under-20 international soccer players
Real Monarchs players
MLS Next Pro players